The Riace bronzes (Italian: Bronzi di Riace), also called the Riace Warriors, are two full-size Greek bronzes of naked bearded warriors, cast about 460–450 BC that were found in the sea in 1972 near Riace, Calabria, in southern Italy. The bronzes are now in the Museo Nazionale della Magna Grecia in the nearby city of Reggio Calabria.  They are two of the few surviving full-size ancient Greek bronzes (which were usually melted down in later times), and as such demonstrate the superb technical craftsmanship and exquisite artistic features that were achieved at this time.

The bronzes are now on display inside a microclimate room on top of an anti-seismic platform faced in Carrara marble. Along with the bronzes, the room also contains two head sculptures: Testa del Filosofo and Testa di Basilea, which are also from the 5th century BC.

Although the bronzes were discovered in 1972, they did not emerge from conservation until 1981. Their public display in Florence and Rome was the cultural event of that year in Italy, providing the cover story for numerous magazines. Now considered one of the symbols of Calabria, the bronzes were commemorated by a pair of Italian postage stamps and have also been widely reproduced.

The two bronze sculptures are simply known as “Statue A”, referring to the one portraying a younger warrior, and “Statue B”, indicating the more mature-looking of the two. Both sculptures were made using the lost wax casting technique.

Discovery

There is still debate on who found the statues. One theory states that Stefano Mariottini, then a chemist from Rome, chanced upon the bronzes while snorkeling near the end of a vacation at Monasterace. While diving some 200 metres from the coast of Riace, at a depth of six to eight metres, Mariottini noticed the left arm of statue A emerging from the sand. At first he thought he had found a dead human body, but on touching the arm he realized it was a bronze arm. Mariottini began to push the sand away from the rest of statue A. Later, he noticed the presence of another bronze nearby and decided to inform the cultural departement in Reggio Calabria. 

The other theory, which is usually more widely accepted, is that it was found by four young teenagers from Riace itself. Having found the statues underwater, they went to the government finances office, in nearby Monasterace, where they declared their find. 

One week later, on August 21, statue B was taken out of the water, and statue A was taken out two days after. No associated wreck site has been identified, but in the immediate locality, which is a subsiding coast, architectural remains have also been found.

The bronzes and the story of their discovery were featured in the first episode of the 2005 BBC television documentary series How Art Made the World, which included an interview with Stefano Mariottini.

In his book "Facce di Bronzo", published in 2008, the bronze expert Giuseppe Braghò has revealed that the official finding records of 1972, based on Mariottini declarations, reported the presence not only of a helmet and a shield, but also of a third bronze statue with open arms, none of which was taken out of the water during the official recovery. These archaeological finds are believed to have been stolen days before the official recovery and sold to a collector abroad. Evidence that statue A and statue B were found in a different position at the time of official recovery, compared to what was reported and registered at the time of discovery is also given, suggesting that attempts to remove the statues from the place of discovery had occurred.

In summer 2019, the Italian TV show Le Iene started an enquiry in relation to the mystery of the missing archaeological finds at the Riace site, and interviewed Mariottini asking clarifications about his declarations at the time of discovery. Mariottini refused to comment.

History and origin 

At the time the sculptures were made, much of Calabria (especially the coastal cities) was inhabited by Greek-speaking peoples as part of Magna Graecia ("Greater Greece"), as the "overseas" Greek territories came to be called.  The most popular theory is that two separate Greek artists created the bronzes about 30 years apart around the 5th century BC. “Statue A” was probably created between the years 460 and 450 BC, and “Statue B” between 430 and 420 BC. Some believe that “Statue A” was the work of Myron, and that a pupil of Phidias, called Alkamenes, created “Statue B”. Statue A portrays a young warrior hero or god with a proud look, conscious of his own beauty and power. Statue B, on the other hand, portrays an older more mature warrior hero with a relaxed pose and a kind and gentle gaze.

The Riace bronzes are major additions to the surviving examples of ancient Greek sculpture. They belong to a transitional period from archaic Greek sculpture to the early Classical style, disguising their idealized geometry and impossible anatomy under a distracting and alluring "realistic" surface. They are fine examples of contrapposto - their weight is on the back legs, making them much more realistic than with many other Archaic stances. Their musculature is clear, yet not incised, and looks soft enough to be visible and realistic. The bronzes' turned heads not only confer movement, but also add life to the figures. The asymmetrical layout of their arms and legs adds realism to them. The eyes of Statue A are formed of calcite (originally supposed to be ivory), while their teeth are made with silver. Their lips and nipples are made of copper. At one time, they held spears and shields, but those have not been found. Additionally, Warrior B once wore a helmet pushed up over his head, and it is thought that Warrior A may have worn a wreath over his. The average thickness of the bronze is 8.5 mm (0.33 inch) for Statue A and 7.5 mm (0.3 inches) for Statue B.

Origin

It is generally assumed that the statues were being carried on a ship that sank, perhaps in a storm, although no evidence of a wreck has been found.  It is not impossible that the statues were on their way to a local destination, either near the time of their creation or later. Further explorations undertaken in 2004 by a joint Italian-American team of archaeologists identified the foundations of an Ionic temple on this slowly subsiding coast. Undersea explorations by robotic vehicles along the submerged coastline from Locri to Soverato are providing a more detailed picture of this coast in Antiquity, although no further bronzes comparable to those of Riace have been found.

Attributions of such spectacular works of art to famous sculptors have followed traditional lines: "all the 'big' names of Classical times have been proposed in this connection", Brunilde Sismondo Ridgway writes, noting that she finds it encouraging that at least a few scholars are willing to consider a non-Attic, even a 'colonial' workshop of origin, as contrasted with "the dominant Athenocentrism of previous years."

While it is certain that the bronzes are original works of the highest quality, it has also been argued that their torsos have been produced from a single model, which was then altered with direct modifications to the wax before casting, so that they may be seen as types.

Identification

There is no clear testimony in ancient literature to identify the athletes or heroes depicted by the bronzes. It seems that the two nudes originally formed part of a votive group in a large sanctuary. It is conjectured that the bronze sculptures may represent Tydeus and Amphiaraus respectively, two of the  warriors from the Seven against Thebes monumental group in the polis of Argos, as Pausanias noted. 

However, they may also be Athenian warriors from Delphi, part of the monument to the Battle of Marathon, or they may come from Olympia. Argos, Delphi and Olympia were three prominent Greek sites for dedicated sculpture of the highest quality, and all three were vulnerable to official plundering following the Roman occupation. Perhaps the bronzes were being transported, long after they were created, to Italy as part of one of the waves of large-scale plundering of Greek art that occurred at various dates after the Roman conquest of Greece.  

Salvatore Settis and Vinzenz Brinkmann (Liebieghaus Polychromy Research Project) identify the warriors as Erechtheus, son of Athena, and Eumolpos, son of Poseidon. A group of two bronze statues depicting Erechtheus and Eumolpos near to the temple of Athena on the Athenian acropolis is mentioned by Pausanias 1.27.4:

“... large bronze figures of men facing each other for a fight, one of whom they call Erechtheus, the other Eumolpos ...”

2009–2011 restoration
In December 2009, the Riace Bronzes were transported to the Palazzo Campanella in Reggio before restoration work began on the Museo Nazionale della Magna Grecia. In early 2010, expert art restorers Cosimo Schepis (also known as Nuccio Schepis) and Paola Donati began restoration work on the Riace bronzes. Restoration work on the two bronze sculptures was completed in 2011.

Notes

References 
 "Bronzi Di Riace, Ritrovata Una Ciglia Della Statua "B": Era Abbandonata Nello Scantinato Del Museo." Corriere Della Calabria. Sviluppo Editoria Calabria S.r.l., 23 Oct. 2013.
 Kleiner, Fred S., Gardner's Art Through the Ages: The Western Perspective, Volume 1 (Cengage Learning, 2009)
 Muzzupappa, M., A. Gallo, R. M. Mattanò, C. Ruggiero, and F. Bruno. "A Complete Morphological Study of the Right Hand of Bronzo “A” Di Riace." (2012): 55-59. Multi Science Publishing.
 "Nuccio Schepis Respinge Al Mittente Le Polemiche Sul Presunto ‘abbandono’ Dei Bronzi Di Riace." Fame Di Sud. Ed. Aliamedia Società Cooperativa Editrice Scarl - Bari. Ermete Limited, 5 Sept. 2013.
 "Trasloco E "tagliando" per I Bronzi Di Riace." Repubblica.it. Gruppo Editoriale L’Espresso, n.d.
 Salvatore Settis, Maurizio Paoletti, „ Sul buono e sul cattivo uso dei bronzi di Riace“, (2012).
 Vinzenz Brinkmann, Ulrike Koch-Brinkmann, „The Riace Bronzes Experiment, Aestetics and Narrative“, in: Ahoros. Gedenkschrift für Hugo Meyer (2018) pp. 15-34.
 Castrizio, Daniele. The Riace Bronzes. Recent Research and New Scientific Knowledge. Actual Problems of Theory and History of Art: Collection of articles. Vol. 9. Ed: A. V. Zakharova, S. V. Maltseva, E. Iu. Staniukovich-Denisova.  Lomonosov Moscow State University / St. Petersburg, NP-Print, 2019, pp. 67–74. ISSN 2312-2129

External links and further reading 

"I Bronzi di Riace - Le altre verità" del Prof. Giuseppe Braghò
Nigel Spivey, "The beauty myth", The New Statesman, 2 May 2005
Mariottini interview 
Bruno Gemelli, "Vissi d'arte, vissi di code" 
"Sotto il mare caccia segreta ai “nuovi” bronzi di Riace" 14 September 2004
Lombardi, Satriani & Paoletti (eds.) Gli Eroi Venuti Dal Mare Heroes from the Sea: The Photographic Record of the Riace Bronzes.  Gangemi Editore.
The Riace Warriors are extensively discussed and illustrated in Programme One ("More Human Than Human...") of the five-part series How Art Made The World, written and narrated by Dr Nigel Spivey, who offers, in the programme, the opinion that they are the "best statues ever made." How Art Made The World is also available as a book (Basic Books, 2006).
Pedley, John Griffiths, "Greek Art and Archeology" (Fourth ed. by Pearson- Prentice Hall, 2007), pp. 234–237.
High resolution photos of the statues on "The History Blog": "Bronze A", "Bronze B"

Dafas, K. A., 2019. Greek Large-Scale Bronze Statuary: The Late Archaic and Classical Periods, Institute of Classical Studies, School of Advanced Study, University of London, Bulletin of the Institute of Classical Studies, Monograph, BICS Supplement 138 (London), pp. 51-67, pls 41-57.

5th-century BC Greek sculptures
Calabrian culture
Art of Magna Graecia
1972 archaeological discoveries
Ancient Greek bronze statues of the classical period
Archaeological discoveries in Italy
Ancient Greek military art
Bronze sculptures in Italy
Nude sculptures in Italy
Sculptures of men